Only the Animals is a 2014 book by Ceridwen Dovey (Hamish Hamilton). It is her second book after Blood Kin (2008). It is a collection of ten short stories about the souls of ten animals caught up in human conflicts over the last century and tell their stories of life and death.

References 

 Ceridwen Dovey's author website  Accessed 21 February 2008
 The Australian review of Only the Animals  Accessed 7 May 2014
 The Saturday paper  Accessed 7 May 2014
 Australian Book Review  Accessed May 2014

2014 short story collections
Hamish Hamilton books